The National Fascist Community (NOF, sometimes translated as National Fascist League) was a Czechoslovak Fascist movement led by Radola Gajda, and based on the Fascism of Benito Mussolini.

Formation and ideology
The party was formed in March 1926 by the merger of a group of dissident National Democrats known as the "Red-Whites" with various other rightist groups across Bohemia and Moravia. It was distinguished by a strong current of opposition to Germany, which continued even after Adolf Hitler had come to power. The NOF instead looked to Italy as its model, and based itself wholly on Mussolini's National Fascist Party. In this respect it differed markedly from its chief rival Vlajka, which was firmly in the Hitler camp. Groups targeted by the NOF for criticism included the Jews, communists, the Czechoslovak government and the Magyars. It set up a youth group and a trade union movement, although the latter was minor. The group also advocated a policy of Pan-Slavism, and hoped to take a joint lead with Poland of a grand Slavic alliance that would overthrow communism in the Soviet Union. They also believed in a corporatist economy with a large agricultural sector. The NOF attracted some early support from veterans of the Czechoslovak Legions. It was estimated by a government informer that the NOF had as many as 200,000 followers in 1926, although it had virtually no support in the Slovak area as the far right there was dominated by an indigenous movement.

Activity
The NOF regularly indulged in street-fighting tactics, clashing frequently with the National Labour Party, a moderate left-wing party led by Jaroslav Stránský. Such was the frequency of NOF attacks on Stránský and fellow leader Václav Bouček in 1927 that both men were provided with bodyguards by the government. The NOF even made plans for a possible coup d'etat and secured the support of Slovak paramilitary group Rodobrana in this endeavour although ultimately the plans were intercepted by Brno police and thus shelved.

Decline

In the 1929 elections the NOF ran under the name "Against Fixed-Order Lists", but won three seats. Gajda was elected to Parliament, but the party failed to maintain its support, and received only 2% of the vote and seven seats in Chamber of Deputies in the elections of 1935.

The NOF attempted a comeback during the German occupation, although the Nazis did not support due to their earlier criticism and their overall minor status. Ultimately the NOF were disbanded and largely absorbed into the puppet National Partnership, Gajda having been bribed to leave politics. The party's demise was sealed in late 1939 when they organised a rally in Prague's Wenceslas Square and only managed to attract 300 supporters.

Electoral results

References

Anti-communism in Czechoslovakia
Antisemitism in Europe
Czech nationalism
Political parties established in 1926
Fascism in Europe
Fascist parties
Political parties in Czechoslovakia
Political parties disestablished in 1939
1926 establishments in Czechoslovakia
1939 disestablishments in Czechoslovakia
Pan-Slavism
Anti-Hungarian sentiment